The 66th Illinois Veteran Volunteer Infantry Regiment (Western Sharpshooters) originally known as Birge's Western Sharpshooters and later as  the "Western Sharpshooters-14th Missouri Volunteers", was a specialized regiment of infantry sharpshooters that served in the Union Army during the American Civil War. The regiment was intended, raised, and mustered into Federal service as the Western Theater counterpart to Army of the Potomac's 1st and 2nd United States Volunteer Sharpshooters ("Berdan's Sharpshooters").

Independent service 
"Birge's Western Sharpshooters" was a multi-state, Federal unit organized at St. Louis, Missouri and mustered into federal service on November 23, 1861. Initially two companies were raised in Ohio, three in Illinois, one in Michigan, and four were organized at St Louis' Benton Barracks of Missourians and detachments of volunteer candidates sent by recruiting officers from Iowa, Minnesota and other western states, thus forming a regiment that represented every state in the west, a pet scheme of General John C. Fremont.

During the unit's existence it was re-designated first as the "Western Sharpshooters-14th Missouri Volunteers", and later re-designated again as the "66th Illinois Volunteer Infantry (Western Sharpshooters)".  While federal and state authorities repeatedly changed the formal designation of the unit, the regiment was commonly referred to as the "Western Sharpshooters" (or simply "The Sharpshooters") for the duration of the war. After the war autographs by former members often included the appellation W.S.S.

Companies of the Western Sharpshooters
"Welker's Company" (WSS's original Company A): Missouri men with some outstate members
Company A: "Boyd's Company", Missouri and outstate members
Company B: Missouri and outstate members
Company C: Illinois (Bureau and Logan Counties) and some Iowa men
Company D: Michigan
Company E: Illinois (Edgar County)
Company F: Missouri and outstate members
Company G: 1st Independent Company of Ohio Volunteer Sharpshooters (Reed's Sharpshooters)
Company H: 2nd Independent Company of Ohio Volunteer Sharpshooters (Dougherty's Sharpshooters)
Company I: Illinois (Lawrence County)
Company K: 3rd Independent Company of Ohio Volunteer Sharpshooters (Taylor's Sharpshooters)

The regiment was envisioned as a specialized unit of marksmen and skirmishers, a Western Theater counterpart to Colonel Hiram Berdan's 1st and 2nd U.S. Sharpshooters (raised from multiple states under President Lincoln's patronage for service in the Eastern Theater). On August 28, 1861, Fremont authorized a St. Louis physician, John Ward Birge, to raise the regiment and muster recruits at Benton Barracks, St. Louis.

As marksmen, Fremont intended that they should have a special uniform based on "hunter's dress" and be armed with highly accurate Plains Rifles (handmade half-stock long rifles), provided by the famed St. Louis firearms firm of Horace (H.E.) Dimick of St. Louis (a competitor of the Hawken Brothers, also of St. Louis). While the majority of the special uniform envisioned by Fremont did not survive long beyond his removal (except for an extraordinary sugar loaf hat decorated with three squirrel tails), Dimick fulfilled his contract, providing over 1,000 long rifles, although he had to scour regional (and even east coast) gunmakers to fulfill the enormous order for handmade weapons in the time allotted. The Western Sharpshooters found the "Dimick Rifle" (as the unit called them, although Dimick's gunsmiths built only about 150) to be lethally accurate and declared themselves "well pleased" with the Plains Rifles.

Fremont's scheme was partially squelched by Major General Halleck when he relieved Fremont in November 1862, ending additional recruitment. General Halleck returned a tenth company of Missouri sharpshooters under Captain John Welker (which had initially been recruited by Birge, but detached on MG Fremont's orders for his southwestern expedition, and subsequently operated as an independent company), bringing Birge's Western Sharpshooters up to full strength of ten companies. Immediately afterward, Halleck ordered the partially equipped and trained sharpshooters into the field in guerrilla racked central and northern Missouri. On December 12, 1861, Colonel John W. Birge, of St. Louis, marched them from Benton Barracks to Centralia, in Northern Missouri. The regiment was then deployed in small detachments to fight bands of the secessionist Missouri State Guard and guerrillas attacking the strategically vital North Missouri Rail Road and other targets of interest to the Federal government. On December 28, 1861, five companies of Birge's Sharpshooters and five companies of cavalry fought a mixed force of Missouri State Guard and secessionist volunteers at the small, but strategically important Battle of Mount Zion Church.

On February 4, 1862, the sharpshooters were first shipped by railroad to St. Louis and then by steamboat to Fort Henry, where they eventually arrived on the 9th, just too late to take part in its capture. (Note: As they passed through St. Louis, Maj. Gen. Halleck ordered Company A (Welker's Company) stripped out of the regiment and reassigned to the newly forming 26th Missouri Volunteer Infantry Regiment, temporarily reducing the regiment to nine companies). At Fort Henry, the Sharpshooters joined Colonel Lauman's brigade of General C.F. Smith's division and marched with them to Fort Donelson. In Grant's army they served at the Battle of Fort Donelson and the Battle of Shiloh.

Missouri service 
On April 14, 1862, acting commander Lt Col B.S. Compton received a letter informing him that on the order of Major General Henry Halleck, Commander of the Department of Missouri, the regiment had been redesignated the "Western Sharpshooters-14th Missouri Volunteers".

The redesignated WSS-14th MO Vols, participated in General Halleck's long advance on the Confederate rail center at Corinth, Mississippi, skirmishing ahead of the main force almost every day. On May 30, 1862 Confederate General P.G.T. Beauregard evacuated the city without a fight. The Sharpshooters were then stationed in the Corinth area.

On July 8, 1862, the regiment's new commander Colonel Patrick E. Burke arrived. A veteran militia officer, he had been awarded a Regular Army Captain's commission following service in the old 1st Missouri Volunteers in  General Lyon's Missouri campaigns (including participation in the stand at Bloody Hill at  Wilson's Creek)  . Colonel Burke used the period at Corinth to integrate new recruits from Camp Butler and unify the regiment as a military organization.

In mid-September 1862, in response to the offensive by Confederate Generals Earl Van Dorn and Sterling Price, a three company battalion of the Sharpshooters marched south with Major General Rosecrans' army towards Iuka, Mississippi. This detachment participated in the September 19th battle. They then returned to Corinth, where the entire regiment fought on both days of the October 3rd-4th (2nd) Battle of Corinth. On Oct 4th, as per General Rosecrans' orders, the regiment fought as skirmishers in the timber in front of the Federal fortifications (to the right of a 3 company battalion of the  64th Illinois ["Yates' Sharpshooters"]).  They skirmished under the direct command of Colonel Burke from 4 a.m. to around 10 a.m., when they began to fall back on the main Federal line. When the Federal center collapsed, the regiment fell back again towards the town and Battery Robinette, where they continued to fight until the Confederate breach was contained.

Illinois service 
After the Second Battle of Corinth, the regiment helped establish Camp Davies, a stockaded outpost six miles south of Corinth.  In December, 1862 (after the strong intervention of Governor Yates of Illinois) the Sharpshooters were transferred to Illinois service as the 66th Illinois Volunteer Infantry (Western Sharpshooters) on November 20, 1862. (The regiment was allowed to maintain the Western Sharpshooters as part of its official designation following a request by letter to Governor Yates from Colonel Burke.) Beginning in the autumn of 1863 the men of the regiment began equipping themselves with the new 16 shot Henry Repeating Rifle, giving them a major advantage in firepower over their Confederate opponents. Over 250 of the sharpshooters spent an average of 40 dollars out of pocket (over three months pay for a Private) to arm themselves with this highly effective new weapon. The government, while it did not purchase the weapons, did provide Henry rifle cartridges for companies whose soldiers had done so.

The regiment remained at Camp Davies until November 12, 1863, when 2nd Division, XVI Corps moved to Pulaski, Tennessee, where they established "Camp P.E. Burke".  During December 1863, 470 men of the regiment re-enlisted and in January, 1864, were sent to Chicago to be given veteran furlough.  After being re-organized as a veteran regiment of 600 men, they returned to Pulaski, until April 29, when they left for Chattanooga to join in the Atlanta Campaign.

The regiment left Chattanooga on May 6, and three days later opened the fighting against the Army of Tennessee, at Snake Creek Gap and the Battle of Resaca. There, on May 9, the Sharpshooters singlehandedly captured the Heights at Resaca, Georgia. Throughout the Atlanta Campaign, the regiment was used as the scouting and skirmishing spearhead of XVI Army Corps and participated in ten major battles.

After the Atlanta Campaign, the regiment was attached to the XV Corps where they remained until they mustered out. They participated in Sherman's March to the Sea and the Carolinas Campaign and their last combat action of the war was at the Battle of Bentonville.  The regiment accompanied Sherman to Washington, D.C., where they marched in the Grand Review of the Armies on May 24, 1865, and were subsequently discharged from service on July 7, 1865.

Total strength and casualties
The regiment lost six officers and 73 enlisted men who were killed in action or mortally wounded and two officers and 146 enlisted men who died of disease, for a total of 227 fatalities.

Commanders
Colonel John W. Birge - commissioned a colonel, Birge was replaced by;
Lieutenant Colonel Benjamin S. Compton
Colonel Patrick E. Burke - mortally wounded at the Battle of Rome Cross Roads on May 16, 1864, while commanding 2nd Brigade, 2nd Division, Left Wing, XVI Corps, Army of the Tennessee. Died at Resaca, Georgia, on the morning of May 20, 1864;
Captain William S. Boyd - Captain of Co A, and in tactical command of the regiment when Burke was wounded, continued in de facto field command of the Regiment through the March to the Sea;
Lieutenant Colonel Andrew K. Campbell - Mustered out with the regiment.

Corporal Lemuel Trowbridge (Calvin) Trowbridge

See also
List of Illinois Civil War Units
Illinois in the American Civil War
List of United States Volunteer Civil War units
64th Illinois Volunteer Infantry-"Yates Sharpshooters"

Notes

References
The Civil War Archive
Reenactors: 1st Independent Company of Ohio Volunteer Sharpshooters, also known as Co G, WESTERN SHARPSHOOTERS
Reenactors portraying Company D ("The Michigan Boys"), Western Sharpshooters
Regimental Colors and National Colors of the Western Sharpshooters
 Information on Battle of Lay's Ferry at the Friends of Resaca Battlefield website
 CDV of soldier of 66th Illinois Infantry Regiment
Units and formations of the Union Army from Missouri
Units and formations of the Union Army from Illinois
Sharpshooter units and formations of the American Civil War
1861 establishments in Illinois
Military units and formations established in 1861
Military units and formations disestablished in 1865